Voivodeship road 103 (abbreviated DW 103) is a route in the Polish voivodeship roads network. The route runs in the north of the West Pomeranian Voivodeship for 36 km which links Kamień Pomorski with Trzebiatów. The route runs through two powiats (Gmina Kamień Pomorski and Gmina Świerzno.

Major cities and towns along the route 

Kamień Pomorski
Mokrawica
Świerzno
Ciećmierz
Paprotno
Cerkwica
Chomętowo
Trzebiatów

Route plan

References

103